Sarah Elizabeth Rees (born 1957) is Professor of Pure Mathematics at Newcastle University. Her focus of research is on geometrical, combinatorial and computational aspects of group theory.

Rees obtained her Ph.D. in 1983 from the University of Oxford. Her dissertation, supervised by Peter Cameron, was On Diagram Geometry.

In 2003, Rees was a member of the expert panel for BBC Radio 4's In Our Time on infinity.

Selected publications

References

External links

British women mathematicians
Alumni of the University of Oxford
Academics of Newcastle University
Living people
1957 births